Saddest Factory Records is an American record label that was founded on October 5, 2020, by Phoebe Bridgers. The label operates as an imprint of Dead Oceans and artists that have been signed to the label include Sloppy Jane, MUNA, Claud, and Charlie Hickey.

History 
After releasing her second album, Punisher, Phoebe Bridgers founded Saddest Factory Records on October 5, 2020. The label's name, "Saddest Factory", was first coined on twitter by Phoebe Bridgers' former bandmate, Haley Dahl of Sloppy Jane. The name comes from a mispronunciation of the word "satisfactory". The label was founded as an imprint of Dead Oceans, and the first artist to be signed to the label was Claud. On May 19, 2021, MUNA became the second artist to be signed to the label. Charlie Hickey was the third artist to be signed to the label, with a remake of "Seeing Things", featuring MUNA, being released in celebration.

Roster

Current artists 
Charlie Hickey
Claud
Muna
Sloppy Jane

Former artists 
ScruffPuppie

Discography
Claud – Super Monster (2021)
Sloppy Jane – Madison (2021)
Charlie Hickey – Nervous at Night (2022)
Muna  – Muna (2022)

References

External links 
Official website

Dead Oceans
American independent record labels
Record labels established in 2020
Indie rock record labels
Vanity record labels